Robert Nutting (born 1947) is a Republican politician from Maine who served six terms in the Maine House of Representatives. He re-joined the House after a two-year absence in 2008 and was elected speaker by the incoming Republican majority following the 2010 election, becoming the first Republican Maine House Speaker since 1974.

Nutting married Wendy Libby in 1968. They have three children and five grandchildren.

Nutting was born in Maine. His father was a roofer and plumber and his mother was a nurse. He has two older siblings, a sister and a brother, who are both retired teachers. He graduated from Skowhegan Area High School in 1965 and attained a Bachelor of Science in Pharmacy at the Massachusetts College of Pharmacy in 1970.

Nutting works in a Walmart pharmacy, though from 1972 to 2003 he owned and operated True's Pharmacy in Oakland. His pharmacy was forced to close following a billing dispute with the state Department of Human Services in which they were accused of over-billing MaineCare, the state's version of Medicaid, for up to $2.3 million. Nutting has received several industry awards and honors and served on the boards of directors of area business groups as well as having formerly been President of the Maine Pharmacy Association.

Nutting left the Speakership on December 3, 2012, after the Democrats retook the House majority. As of 2022, he is the last Republican Maine House Speaker.

References

1947 births
21st-century American politicians
Living people
MCPHS University alumni
People from Oakland, Maine
Pharmacists from Maine
Skowhegan Area High School alumni
Speakers of the Maine House of Representatives
Republican Party members of the Maine House of Representatives